The Ritz-Carlton, Portland is a planned Ritz-Carlton hotel under construction on Block 216 in Portland, Oregon, United States. The hotel will have approximately 250 rooms, and Ritz-Carlton will also manage 138 condominiums. The hotel will be Ritz-Carlton's first in the Pacific Northwest. A groundbreaking for the project was held on July 12, 2019.

References

Buildings and structures under construction in the United States
Hotels in Portland, Oregon
Southwest Portland, Oregon
The Ritz-Carlton Hotel Company